Vayres is the name or part of the name of the following communes in France:

 Vayres, Gironde, in the Gironde department
 Vayres, Haute-Vienne in the Haute-Vienne department
 Vayres-sur-Essonne, in the Essonne department